Yukiko Miyake (March 5, 1965 – January 2, 2020) was an American-born Japanese politician. She served one term in the Japanese House of Representatives.

Career

Early life 
Miyake's father, Wasuke Miyake, was a diplomat to the United States, and she was thus born in Washington D.C. Her maternal grandfather is Hirohide Ishida. She held Japanese citizenship. She attended Toho Joshi middle and high school, Tamagawa Gakuen Junior College for Women, and Kyoritsu Women's University.

Fuji Television 
In 1988, Miyake began working for Fuji Television. She worked in sales, newsroom, and corporate social responsibility departments. When she worked in the newsroom, she reported on the economy, especially exchange rates and the stock exchange.

Politics 
On July 27, 2009, Ichiro Ozawa asked Miyake to run for office. She left her job at Fuji TV to do so. She ran for office during the 2009 Japanese general election against Yasuo Fukuda, the former Prime Minister of Japan, to represent Gunma's 4th district in the House of Representatives. Her grandfather's secretary, Masaki Nakajima, was also a candidate, but Miyake became the Democratic Party's official candidate. During the previous election in 2005, the Democrat's candidate lost to Fukuda by about 62,000 votes. Japanese media called Miyake and other women who Ozawa urged to run for office "Ozawa girls". Their goal was to replace established politicians with fresh blood in order to create a more inclusive political environment. While she lost the election for the district seat, she was elected to the proportional representation block.

On January 22, 2012, Miyake announced on Twitter that she would be the vice chair of a committee to reduce the cost of electricity.

In the same year, Miyake opposed a bill to raise the consumption tax, and resigned from her position as the Democratic Party's vice chair of public relations on April 23. On June 26, she voted against the consumption tax, contrary to her party's strategy. On July 2, Miyake tendered her resignation from the party alongside Kenji Yamaoka and other party members. However, the Democratic Party's Board of Governors didn't accept the resignation letters during their meeting on July 3, but officially accepted them during their meeting on July 9.

After resigning from the Democratic party, Miyake joined People's Life First, a new political party, on July 11. She then lost the 2012 Japanese general election.

In July 2013, Miyake was the Liberal Party's candidate in the 23rd Japanese House of Councillors election, but was not elected.

After some trouble with other members of her party, Miyake left the Liberal Party in April 2015.

Death 
On January 2, 2020, Tokyo Wangan Police Station found a body near Tokyo Bay, which was presumed to have committed suicide in the water. TWPS confirmed and made an announcement on January 6 that the dead person was Miyake.

References

External links 
 Official website
 公式Official blog

1965 births
2020 deaths
2020 suicides
Japanese politicians who committed suicide
Suicides by drowning in Japan
Politicians from Washington, D.C.
Female members of the House of Representatives (Japan)
Democratic Party (Japan, 2016) politicians
Twitter username not in Wikidata
21st-century Japanese politicians